Bedminster is a census-designated place (CDP) comprising the primary community in Bedminster Township, Somerset County, New Jersey, United States. It was first listed as a CDP prior to the 2020 census.

The community is in northern Somerset County, in the east part of Bedminster Township. It is bordered to the east by the borough of Far Hills and to the north by the borough of Peapack and Gladstone. U.S. Routes 202 and 206 pass through the community. US 202 leads northeast  to Morristown, while US 206 leads north  to Netcong. Together, the two highways lead south  to Somerville.

Demographics

References 

Census-designated places in Somerset County, New Jersey
Census-designated places in New Jersey
Bedminster, New Jersey